Adrian Snodgrass is an Australian architect and scholar in Buddhist studies and Buddhist art. He has developed theories in the area of hermeneutical philosophy and its application to knowledge production and cross-cultural understanding. Snodgrass is co-editor of the journal Architectural Theory Review and Editor of Architectural Theory.

He is an Honorary Life Member of The Asian Arts Society of Australia (TAASA); President of the Australasian Association for Buddhist Studies (AABS); Research Associate in the Faculty of Architecture, Design and Planning in The University of Sydney; Senior Research Fellow in the School of Languages and Cultures at the same university; and Adjunct Professor in the Centre for Cultural Research at the University of Western Sydney. His son, also called Adrian Snodgrass, is a social justice lawyer who started the Melbourne law firm ASA Law in 2015.

Works
Snodgrass is noted for several books on Asian art and symbolism, and for work developing the theme of hermeneutics in relation to architectural design. His scholarship draws substantially on the work of Martin Heidegger, Hans-Georg Gadamer and numerous Japanese and Indian scholars to demonstrate that for us one of the chief values of historical study, and the study of cultures other than our own, resides in our encounter with their "otherness":

Asian Studies should aim not only to provide a knowledge of language, factual information and skills in critical analysis, but also to foster in a learning and research community the dialectics of interpretation, in which what is alien in the text of the other becomes the starting point for a process of questioning the horizons of our own prejudicial world in the hope of expanding and transforming them.

Sources

Living people
Hermeneutists
Heidegger scholars
Australian scholars of Buddhism
Year of birth missing (living people)